John Frederick Smith (1806–1890) was an English novelist, who has been called "England's most popular novelist of the mid-nineteenth century". 
Smith became famous for his serializations in The London Journal.

Smith edited Martin Luther and the Reformation in Germany until the Close of the Diet of Worms (1889), which was begun by Charles Beard but left extremely incomplete due to his death in 1888.

Works
Stanfield Hall (serialized 1849 in The London Journal; 3 vols, 1888–89)
Minnigrey (1851–52)
Will and the Way
Woman and her Master
Temptation

Notes

References
Michael Wheeler, ‘Smith, John Frederick (1806–1890)’, rev., Oxford Dictionary of National Biography, Oxford University Press, 2004, accessed 9 Sept 2007

1806 births
1890 deaths
English male novelists
19th-century English novelists
19th-century English male writers